Yorkey is a surname. Notable people with the surname include:

Brian Yorkey (born 1970), American playwright and lyricist
John H. Yorkey (1856–1907), American politician

See also
 Yerkey
 Yorkey Crossing
 Yorkeys Knob, Queensland